Jorge Arreola Barraza  born in (Ciudad Juárez, Chichuahua, 1985) is  a Mexican photographer, conceptual, and performance artist. He is best known for his urban documentary photography of his hometown Ciudad Juarez, Mexico. He exhibits worldwide.

References

1985 births
Living people
Artists from Chihuahua (state)
Mexican photographers